Kang Pan-sŏk (21 April 1892 – 31 July 1932) was the mother of North Korean leader Kim Il-sung.

Biography 
She came from the village of Chilgol and raised Kim on a small farm in Mangyongdae, both near Pyongyang. She accepted, but rarely participated in her husband's pro-independence activism. After the family fled to Manchuria to avoid arrest, she did not return to Korea. 21 April is a day of memorial for her in North Korea, when a wreath-laying ceremony is held at Chilgol Revolutionary Site.

Legacy 
In North Korea, Kang Pan-sŏk is referred to as the "Mother of Korea" or "Great Mother of Korea". Both titles are shared with Kim Jong-il's mother Kim Jong-suk. However, it was Kang Pan-sŏk who was the first family member of Kim Il-sung to have a cult of personality of her own to supplement that of her son, from the late 1960s onwards. In 1967, Rodong Sinmun praised her as the "mother of all". The same year, the Democratic Women's League initiated a campaign called "Learning from Madame Kang Pan-sŏk". There is a song by the name of "Mother of Korea" in her honor, as well as a hagiographic biography, also called The Mother of Korea (1968).

The Protestant Chilgol Church in Pyongyang is dedicated to the memory of Kang Pan-sok, who was a Presbyterian. Her name meant "rock", having been named for Saint Peter.

References

Further reading

External links 
Chilgol Revolutionary Site picture album  at Naenara
Chilgol Revolutionary Site (video)  at Naenara

1892 births
1932 deaths
People from South Pyongan
Korean independence activists
20th-century North Korean women politicians
Kim dynasty (North Korea)
North Korean Presbyterians
Sincheon Kang clan